Isaak Umbdenstock (born 18 February 1999) is a French professional footballer who plays as a midfielder for  club Nancy.

Club career
Umbdenstock began his footballing career in the youth academy of Colmar as a leftback, and made the move to Sochaux in 2014. On 15 November 2018, he signed his first professional contract with Sochaux, for a length of three seasons.

Umbdenstock made his professional debut for Sochaux in a 0–0 Ligue 2 tie with Troyes on 15 March 2019.

Umbdenstock joined Championnat National 2 side Belfort for a loan spell in January 2020, returning at the end of the season. He commenced a second loan spell, with Championnat National side Bastia-Borgo, in July 2020.

In July 2021, he signed with Chambly in Championnat National.

On 28 June 2022, Umbdenstock signed a two-year contract with Nancy, returning to the club where he played as a junior.

References

External links
 
 
 

1999 births
Living people
People from Colmar
French footballers
Association football midfielders
SR Colmar players
FC Sochaux-Montbéliard players
ASM Belfort players
FC Bastia-Borgo players
FC Chambly Oise players
AS Nancy Lorraine players
Ligue 2 players
Championnat National players
Championnat National 2 players
Championnat National 3 players
Footballers from Alsace